Marian Neacșu (born May 27, 1964, in Coșereni, Ialomița County, Socialist Republic of Romania) is a Romanian politician, deputy in the Romanian Parliament in the 2008–2012 and 2012–2016 legislatures elected on behalf of the Social Democratic Party (PSD), Ialomița branch.

Criminal conviction

Neacșu was definitively sentenced to six months in prison with suspension for committing the crime of conflict of interest, in 2016. He illegally hired his daughter at his parliamentary office. This fact was brought back to public attention in November 2021, when he was proposed and subsequently appointed as Secretary General of the Government. On this occasion, Curentul claimed that in 2012 he facilitated the appointment of his wife in the position of general manager of the insurer PAID Romania, although he did not meet all the necessary conditions for this position.

References

1964 births
People from Ialomița County
21st-century Romanian politicians
Romanian politicians convicted of crimes
Social Democratic Party (Romania) politicians
Members of the Chamber of Deputies (Romania)
Living people